Ustyurtia is the sole genus of moths in the monotypic family Ustyurtiidae.

The species of this genus are found in Kazakhstan.

Species:

Ustyurtia zygophyllivora 
Ustyurtia charynica

References

Ditrysia
Moth genera